Aleksandr Hryhorovych Riabeka, was born November 6, 1959, Ovruch, Zhytomyr Oblast, Ukraine. A Ukrainian political and statesman. People's Deputy of Ukraine of the Vth and VIth convocations.

Education 
 1976 — Secondary School No. 2 in Ovruch.
 1980 — Kamianets-Podilskyi Higher Military Engineering Command School on specialty mechanic engineer.
 1985 —  High Secret Service Courses.
 1991 —  High School of State Security Bodies.
 2011 — presented a thesis and got the degree of PhD of Technical Science at the National Pedagogical Dragomanov University 
 2017 — presented a thesis and got the degree of Doctor of Philosophy at the National Pedagogical Dragomanov University

Working Activity 
 1976—1984 — served in the army at Carpathian Military District and Belorussian Military District.
 1984—1996 — worked at Security Service of Ukraine, including at Zabaikalsky Military District. 
 1995—1996 — fulfilled special tasks as a member of peace-keepers at the former Yugoslavia republics. Military rank – a colonel. 
 2006—2012 — People's Deputy of Ukraine of the Vth, VIth convocations. A member of the deputies faction "Yulia Tymoshenko Bloc — «Fatherland». A chairman of subcommittee on issues of  legislative support of anticorruption policy and control of people’s rights respect, cooperation with social and other organizations of the Verkhovna Rada of Ukraine Committee on issues of the organized crime and corruption.
 2008—2010 — Prime Minister of Ukraine advisor on social grounds.
 2012—2014 — non-payroll advisor of vice-chairman of the Verkhovna Rada of Ukraine.
 Since October 2012 —a teacher, since September 2013 — PhD, professor of the Department of Management, information-analytical activity  and European integration at the National Pedagogical Dragomanov University 
 Since 2016 — a law company co-incorporator ООО «International Company» "VIP Consulting".

Social and political activity  
 Since 2002 — Chairman of All-Ukrainian Social Organization "Association «Chernobyl»’s Afghan War veterans” .
 Since 1993 — a member of central council of All-Ukrainian Social Organization «Chernobyl Union of Ukraine».
 Since 2006 — a member of All-Ukrainian Union "Fatherland".
 2013—2015 — a member Central Control and Revision Commission of All-Ukrainian Union "Fatherland".
 From 2012 to 2016 — counselor of the chairman of the board of directors, the chairman of the board of directors of All-Ukrainian Social Organization «All-Ukrainian Special Body on issues of the organized crime and corruption fight».
 Since 2013 — a member of the Global Organization of Parliamentarians Against Corruption (GOPAC).
 Since 2016 — a member of the board of directors Chernobyl Association of Ukraine's people's deputies.

Honorary degrees  
 Since 2005 — Honoured President of All-Ukrainian Social Organization "All-Ukraine Federation «SPAS».
A participant 
 Accident management at Chernobyl Nuclear plant and war action.

Family 
Mother:  Eva Rafailovna (born in 1934) — a pensioner. Wife: Riabeka Evheniya Oleksandrivna, born in 1983, a lawyer, Legal Adviser to the Commander-in-Chief of the Armed Forces of Ukraine, Candidate of Philosophical Sciences(PhD). Sons: Serhiy  (born in 1982), Pavlo (born in 1984), Lev (born in 2010), Olexandr (born in 2017). Daughter: Mariya (born in 2006)

Honours  
 The Order of Merit (Ukraine) the 2nd class (June 23, 2009), the 3rd class (April 22, 2004)
 Defender of the Motherland Medal (1999).
Medal "For Battle Merit"(USSR,1981).
 Honour «Award Weapon» (2001)
 Recognition Certificate of the Verkhovna Rada of Ukraine (2004).
 Recognition Certificate of the Cabinet of Ministers of Ukraine(2009).

References

External links 

 All-Ukrainian Social Organization "Association «Chernobyl»’s Afghan War veterans”   https://web.archive.org/web/20190126040458/http://www.ac.org.ua/
 Facebook: https://www.facebook.com/oleksandr.ryabeka
 YouTube: https://www.youtube.com/watch?v=Sw_dDLsmttw

1959 births
Living people
People from Ovruch
Laureates of the Honorary Diploma of the Verkhovna Rada of Ukraine
Recipients of the Honorary Diploma of the Cabinet of Ministers of Ukraine